The Santa Rosa Group is a geologic group in Belize and Guatemala. It contains the Chochal Formation. The marine lithified, black, calcareous shales preserve fossils dating back to the Pennsylvanian to Kungurian stages of the Carboniferous and Permian periods.

See also 
 List of fossiliferous stratigraphic units in Belize
 List of fossiliferous stratigraphic units in Guatemala

References

Further reading 

 J. H. Bateson. 1972. New interpretation of geology of Maya Mountains, British Honduras. AAPG Bulletin 56:956-963
 F.G. Stehli and R. E. Grant. 1970. Permian brachiopods from Huehuetenango, Guatemala. Journal of Paleontology 44(1):23-36
 C. G. Dixon. 1956. Geology of southern British Honduras, with notes on adjacent areas 109-85

Geologic groups of North America
Geologic formations of Belize
Geologic formations of Guatemala
Paleozoic North America
Shale formations
Limestone formations
Paleontology in Belize
Paleontology in Guatemala